Façade is a ballet by Frederick Ashton, to the music of William Walton; it is a balletic interpretation of items from Façade – an Entertainment (1923) by Walton and Edith Sitwell. The ballet was first given by the Camargo Society at the Cambridge Theatre, on 26 April 1931. It has been regularly revived and restaged all over the world.

Background
In 1923 Façade – an Entertainment was first given in public. It consisted of poems by Edith Sitwell recited by the author over music composed for the purpose by William Walton, performed by an ensemble of six players. The work was regarded as avant-garde and caused some controversy. In 1926 Walton arranged a suite of five of the numbers, omitting the spoken verses and expanding the orchestration. In 1929 the choreographer Günter Hess created a Façade ballet for the German Chamber Dance Theatre, using Walton's orchestral suite; Sitwell declined to allow her words to be used. Hess visited London in 1930 and is believed to have exchanged ideas with Ashton.

Ashton's ballet was premiered by the Camargo Society, established the previous year to foster the work of British dancers and choreographers. The work was set to the five items of Walton's suite, and orchestrations of two other numbers from the original entertainment, which are thought to have been made for the purpose by Constant Lambert, who conducted the premiere.

Synopsis
Façade is a one-act ballet of seven to ten divertissements, described by the ballet critic Debra Crane as "choreographic satires on popular dance forms and their dancers". There is no plot. The numbers as danced in the original production are:
Scotch Rhapsody
Jodelling Song
Polka
Valse
Popular Song
Tango-Pasodoble
Finale – Tarantella Sevillana.
Ashton revised the ballet over the years. "Country Dance" was added in 1935; "Noche espagnola" and "Foxtrot" in 1940.

Original cast
Scotch Rhapsody –  Prudence Hyman, Maude Lloyd, Antony Tudor
Jodelling Song –  Lydia Lopokova (milkmaid); Frederick Ashton, William Chappell, Walter Gore (mountaineers)
Polka –  Alicia Markova
Valse –  Pearl Argyle, Diana Gould, Maude Lloyd, Prudence Hyman
Popular Song –  William Chappell, Walter Gore
Tango-Pasodoble –  Lydia Lopokova, Frederick Ashton
Finale–Tarantella Sevillana –  Lydia Lopokova, Frederick Ashton and ensemble
Source: Ashton Archive.

Critical reception
The Times commented that the piece admirably translated the spirit of the original poems, but warned, "If the Ballet is going to laugh at itself so freely, it must take care in future that we do not laugh at it in the wrong place." The paper did not consider Façade the highlight of the quintuple bill in which it appeared: that honour went to "Mme Karsavina's Valse Fantasie with music by Glinka". The Manchester Guardian also rated Karsavina's dance as the best thing in the evening, but praised the wit of Ashton's ballet, and singled out Lopokova for the subtlety of her comic performance.

Reviewing a 2005 production by Scottish Ballet, The Times called Ashton's ballet a masterpiece, and The Guardian commented, "The big treat is the company's acquisition of Frederick Ashton's Façade, a perennial audience favourite. This frothy Bright Young Things frolic, dating from 1931, captures the high spirits of the Brideshead world in sparklingly playful comedic vignettes."

Revivals
The ballet was revived in 1932 at the Savoy Theatre. For a new production by the Vic-Wells Ballet in 1935, Ashton added the Country Dance. Among those appearing in this production were Margot Fonteyn and Robert Helpmann. Ashton further expanded the work in 1940, adding the Foxtrot ("Old Sir Faulk") and the Noche espagnola ("Nocturne péruvienne"). The three later additions were sometimes included and sometimes omitted from the Sadler's Wells (later the Royal Ballet) revivals in 1946, 1949, 1950, 1951, 1956 and 1958–9.

In 1972 Ashton prepared a production for the Aldeburgh Festival using the original chamber score with Sitwell's verses recited by Peter Pears. This production was later seen in London, at Sadler's Wells Theatre.

Among the revivals of Ashton's ballet have been those by the Borovansky Ballet (1946), New Zealand Ballet (1960), PACT Ballet (South Africa, 1966), Joffrey Ballet (1969), Australian Ballet (1972), Chicago Ballet (1975), Houston Ballet (1978), Washington Ballet (1983), Royal Winnipeg Ballet (1984), Ballet of the Teatro Regio, Turin (1992) and Scottish Ballet (2005).

Notes and references
Notes

References

Sources
 

1931 ballet premieres
Ballets by Frederick Ashton
Compositions by William Walton